Serhiy Nykyforov or Serhii Yuriiovych Nykyforov (Ukrainian: Сергій Юрійович Никифоров; born 6 February 1994) is a Ukrainian athlete specialising in the long jump. He won a bronze medal at the 2017 European Indoor Championships.

His personal bests in the event are 8.11 metres outdoors (+1.8 m/s, Lutsk 2016) and 8.18 metres indoors (Belgrade 2017).

International competitions

References

1994 births
Living people
Ukrainian male long jumpers
People from Brovary
Sportspeople from Kyiv Oblast